Bogoslof Wilderness is a wilderness area in the U.S. state of Alaska. It encompasses the entirety of Bogoslof Island and nearby Fire Island.

External links
Wilderness.net - Bogoslof Wilderness

Wilderness areas of Alaska
Protected areas of Aleutians West Census Area, Alaska
Alaska Maritime National Wildlife Refuge